Zimri may refer to:

Either of two people in the Bible:
Zimri (prince), the Prince of the Tribe of Simeon during the time when the Israelites were in the desert
Zimri (king), King of Israel after Elah and before Omri
Zimri (nation), a nation mentioned in the Book of Jeremiah
Zimri (tribe), a Pashtun tribe in Pakistan
Leah Horowitz (runner) (Leah Horowitz-Zimri, born 1933), Israeli Olympic hurdler
Zimri D. Thomas (1809–1892), American politician